Ultrasound is a 2021 American science fiction film directed and produced by Rob Schroeder in his feature directorial debut. It is based on the comic book Generous Bosom by Conor Stechschulte, who also wrote the screenplay. It stars Vincent Kartheiser, Chelsea Lopez, Breeda Wool, Tunde Adebimpe, Rainey Qualley, Chris Gartin, and Bob Stephenson. The plot follows a man's sexual encounter with a married woman that results in them questioning their sanity. The film premiered at the Tribeca Film Festival on June 15, 2021, and was released in the United States on March 11, 2022, by Magnet Releasing. It received generally positive reviews from critics.

Plot
On a rainy night, Glen's car runs over a spike strip. He seeks refuge in the nearby home of married couple Art and Cyndi. Art invites him to spend the night. Art makes it clear that he is taking medication for his depression. Cyndi tells Glen that Art was her high school teacher and that she met him when she was 17 years old. Art persuades Glen to sleep with Cyndi. The next day, Glen walks home. Art mysteriously finds Glen and plays him a video showing a pregnant Cyndi. After Art leaves, Glen receives a text message from Cyndi telling him to "get rid" of Art. Glen and Cyndi reunite and talk about the baby.

Glen and Cyndi are actually patients in a mental asylum who have frequent sessions with Shannon and Dr. Conners. Glen reads from a script detailing his interactions with Cyndi. Meanwhile, Cyndi talks about a hypnotist who made her reveal she had a crush on Art. Shannon tells Cyndi that Glen was her high school teacher while Art was the hypnotist. Art had hypnotized Glen and Cyndi and made them believe they were expecting a baby. Dr. Conners reveals that Glen and Cyndi are still receptive to hypnotic suggestions, including convincing Glen that he cannot stand. Thus, when a certain airwave is played, he can stand up when his legs no longer work. Shannon criticizes Dr. Conners for not telling her about the airwave because she believes it is dangerous. Dr. Conners replaces Shannon with another doctor.

Shannon helps Glen and Cyndi escape the asylum and go to a hotel. Cyndi reveals that she was Art's assistant. Art's house where Glen and Cyndi first met was, in fact, an apartment. Using the airwave, Art hypnotized Glen into thinking he had sex with Cyndi.

Hours earlier, Shannon had used the airwave on Cyndi so the sound of running water would remind her of where she was. In the hotel room, Cyndi hears the sound and leaves a trance. Glen and Cyndi are still in the asylum. Shannon finds Dr. Conners, yells at him, and throws a chair that breaks the one-way mirror between them and the patients. Shannon, Glen, and Cyndi run away and leave the asylum once and for all. Glen, however, is still partially in a trance.

Senator Harris and Katie are expecting a baby. Harris hires Art to hypnotize Katie and tell her to stop calling him. Art tells Katie to imagine she had sex with Harris. Harris later hits Art, believing he had sex with Katie. Over the phone, Katie tells someone that she is pregnant. Meanwhile, Harris celebrates his re-election and Art tinkers with an earpiece playing the airwave.

Cast

 Vincent Kartheiser as Glen
 Chelsea Lopez as Cyndi
 Breeda Wool as Shannon
 Tunde Adebimpe as Dr. Conners
 Rainey Qualley as Katie
 Chris Gartin as Senator Harris
 Bob Stephenson as Art

Production
Ultrasound is based on the four-book comic Generous Bosom by Conor Stechschulte, who began writing the screenplay in the summer of 2016. The first draft took four to five months to complete. Beth Nugent, Janet Desaulniers, Jesse Ball, Chris Sullivan, and Jim Trainor contributed to the script. Stechschulte said director and producer Rob Schroeder contacted him after he finished writing the second book in the series: "When he approached me with optioning just the story and get someone else to write the script, I was well ... no: I'd really like to write the script and see where it's going to go. I didn't fully know where it was going to go and I wanted to be in charge of that journey." Schroeder cited The Manchurian Candidate (1962) as a major influence. Filming in Los Angeles concluded on March 19, 2020. Editing was completed by producer Brock Bodell.

Release
Ultrasound premiered at the Tribeca Film Festival on June 15, 2021, at Pier 76 in Hudson River Park. The film was also screened at Fantasia International Film Festival on August 6, 2021. In October 2021, Magnet Releasing acquired the film's distribution rights. The film was released in the United States on March 11, 2022.

Reception
In the United States and Canada, the film earned $2,195 from six theaters in its opening weekend. It reached the bottom of the box office charts in its second weekend with $81 from one theater.

References

External links
 
 

2021 science fiction films
2020s American films
2020s English-language films
American science fiction films
Films about hypnosis
Films based on American comics
Films set in psychiatric hospitals
Films shot in Los Angeles
Live-action films based on comics
Magnet Releasing films